Chondrocera laticornis is a species of leaf-footed bugs in the family Coreidae. They can be found along the east coast of South Florida. They are characterized by the flattened leaf like tibia of its legs, the dilated and segmented 2 and 3 antennal segments.

References

External links 
 Index of Book:Coreidae of Florida
 Bugguide.net: Shows pictures of species

Anisoscelidini
Endemic fauna of Florida
Insects described in 1832